Owen Bowling is a pioneering American gasser drag racer.

Driving a Chrysler-powered 1929 Ford, Bowling won NHRA's first ever A/SR (A Street) national title, at Great Bend, Kansas, in 1955. (His elapsed time was not recorded or has not been preserved.)

Notes

Sources
Davis, Larry. Gasser Wars, North Branch, MN:  Cartech, 2003, pp. 13 caption and 183–8.

Dragster drivers
American racing drivers